The 2016 Gyeongju earthquake occurred on September 12 near Gyeongju, South Korea. Measuring 5.8 on the local magnitude scale (5.4 ), it was the strongest earthquake in the country until the following year. The 2017 Pohang earthquake caused more damage despite being equal in magnitude. Also, at 7:44:32, about an hour before this earthquake occurred, a Local magnitude Scale 5.1 forshock

See also
List of earthquakes in 2016
Yangsan Fault

References

External links

2016 disasters in South Korea
2016 earthquakes
Earthquakes in South Korea
September 2016 events in South Korea
Gyeongju